Feilding railway station was a station on the North Island Main Trunk line in Feilding, New Zealand. It was opened on 1 October 1876 and closed on 1 July 2002. The station is now used by Feilding Information Centre and an occasional excursion train.

The south wall of the station is decorated with a mural, which features Feilding's 1999 clock tower, which has a 1902 clock. The nearby former goods shed has a mural depicting the X Class loco stored at Feilding. The murals were by Eric Brew, who was a resident artist and painted many other murals in the town.

Feilding had hoped to be the junction of the North Island Main Trunk and the Marton–New Plymouth line so had made Kimbolton Road exceptionally wide, but that honour went to Marton and Longburn.

History 
J & C Bull built a 5th class station with platform, goods shed, privies and urinals by 28 April 1876. By July 1876 the rails were in place, linking Palmerston North and Feilding, and ballasting was finished in September. Two platelayers' cottages and a stationmaster's house were built by Burgess & Thompson in 1877 and a ladies waiting room in 1878. In 1973 a  wool loading shelter replaced an earlier one.

The contract for the extension north from Feilding to the Rangitīkei River was let on 28 June 1876. The line was extended to Halcombe from 22 April 1878, thus linking the ports of Foxton and Whanganui to their hinterland.

Feilding gas works opened in 1897 and gas lamps were added to the station in 1901. Electric lighting came on 25 January 1916, after the local power station opened in 1915.

Sawmillers Manson & Bartholomew, later known as Feilding Sash and Door Co, had a tramway link to the railway from 1877 until at least 1916.

A new  by   station, built by Graham Lambert Builders for £27,000, opened on Thursday, 7 December 1961 to replace the old one, burnt down on 29 July 1960.In part of the building was demolished in 1988 after another fire.

Services 

Initially Feilding was served by two trains a day from Foxton.

The first Foxton-Whanganui train on Thursday 18 April 1878 took 6½ hours. The through public service began on 20 May 1878 with two trains a day each way, taking 5hrs 50mins for the  journey.

The first Auckland - Wellington through expresses ran on 14 February 1909, taking 19 hours 13 minutes, and stopping at Feilding. From then on, Feilding was often one of the calls made by the expresses during the night. For example, in 1932, the express from Auckland arrived at 4.20am.

In the 1970s trains calling at Feilding were the Blue Streak and Northerner.

Feilding closed to regular passenger trains when the Overlander was replaced by the Northern Explorer in 2012.

See also 
 Feilding and District Steam Rail Society

References

External links 
Photos -

 F Class loco at Feidling about 1880
damage to Aorangi Bridge approach in 1897 flood
old Aorangi road and rail bridges and in 1878, with bush background
 station and streets about 1910
 fire in 1960
 RM railcar at Feilding in 1974

Defunct railway stations in New Zealand
Railway stations opened in 1876
Railway stations closed in 2002
Rail transport in Manawatū-Whanganui
Buildings and structures in Manawatū-Whanganui
Feilding